Cochylimorpha cuspidata is a species of moth of the family Tortricidae. It is found in China (Anhui, Beijing, Gansu, Hebei, Heilongjiang, Henan, Hubei, Inner Mongolia, Liaoning, Ningxia, Shaanxi, Shanxi, Tianjin) and Korea.

References

Moths described in 1992
Cochylimorpha
Moths of Asia
Moths of Korea